Riverview School District may refer to a school district in the United States:

Riverview School District (Arkansas)
Riverview School District (Pennsylvania)
Riverview School District (Washington)